Boone High School is a public high school located in Boone, Iowa, United States. The school's mascot is the Toreadors, and their colors are red and green. It is part of the Boone Community School District.

Athletics 
The Toreadors compete in the Raccoon River Conference in the following sports:

Fall sports
Cross country (boys and girls)
Swimming (girls)
Volleyball (girls)
Football

Winter sports
Basketball (boys and girls)
 Boys' - 3-time State Champions (1920, 1921, 1931)
Wrestling 
 3-time State Champions (1923, 1924, 1925) 
Swimming (boys)

Spring sports
Track and field (boys and girls)
Golf (boys and girls)
 Boys' - 2-time State Champions (1946, 1970)
Tennis (boys and girls)
 Girls' - 2008 Class 2A State Champions
Soccer (girls)
Baseball
 2-time State Champions (1965, 1967) 
Softball

Notable people

Alumni
 Pete Kostelnick, Ultramarathon runner
 Joyce Lonergan, former Iowa state legislator
Chad Rinehart, NFL player
 Allen C. Winsor, district judge

Faculty
Bucky O'Connor, former coach and athletic director
Bob Vander Plaats, politician, former teacher

See also
List of high schools in Iowa

References

External links
School profile

Public high schools in Iowa
Schools in Boone County, Iowa
Boone, Iowa